Cody Larsen (born December 31, 1987) is a former American football defensive tackle. He played college football at Southern Utah.

Early years
Prepped at Utah's Jordan High School, where he earned all-state honors his junior and senior seasons and helped the Beet Diggers to a region title his senior year for Coach Alex Jacobsen. Also lettered in basketball. Parents are Barbara and LeRoy Larsen.

College career

Southern Utah University

2009
Started all 11 games at defensive tackle, finished the season third among defensive linemen with 27 tackles, including 11 solo tackles. Had 2.5 tackles for loss (for 18 yards), two sacks (for 17 yards) and two quarterback hurries. Joined squad for spring drills.

2010
Started every game. Earned first-team all-GWC honors from the media and second-team recognition from the coaches last year after tallying 29 tackles, 25 solo, with 6.5 TFLs and four sacks from his nose guard spot. Also co-led the team with six QB hurries and earned academic all-GWC honors.

2011
Played in all 11 games with 10 starts, earned consensus first-team all-Great West Conference honors after tallying 26 tackles, 13 solo, including 7.5 TFLs and 6.0 sacks, also had an interception, three QB hurries, forced a fumble, recovered a fumble and blocked a kick. Earned GWC defensive Player of the Week honors after Northern Arizona game when he had 1.5 sacks among his five tackles.

Professional career

Baltimore Ravens
On May 20, 2013, Larsen signed with the Baltimore Ravens as an undrafted free agent.

On December 30, 2013, he re-signed with the team on a futures contract.

Denver Broncos
On July 30, 2014, the Denver Broncos signed Larsen. The Broncos waived Larsen on August 25, 2014.

Personal 
Larsen's younger brother, Tyler, is a center that currently plays with the Washington Commanders of the National Football League.

References

External links
Southern Utah bio 
Baltimore Ravens bio 
LarsenFootball.com

1987 births
Living people
American football defensive tackles
Baltimore Ravens players
Denver Broncos players
Southern Utah Thunderbirds football players
Players of American football from Utah